The 2021 SWAC women's soccer tournament was the postseason women's soccer tournament for the Southwestern Athletic Conference held November 4–7, 2021. The seven-match tournament took place at the Prairie View A&M Soccer Stadium in Prairie View, Texas. The eight-team single-elimination tournament consisted of three rounds based on seeding from regular season conference play. The defending champions were the Alabama State Hornets, however they were unable to defend their title, losing 3–0 to the Prairie View A&M Panthers in the Semifinals.  Prairie View A&M went on to win the tournament, defeating Grambling State in a penalty shoot-out in the Final. The conference tournament title was the second in the history of the Paririe View A&M women's soccer program, both of which have come under head coach Sonia Curvelo. As tournament champions, Prairie View A&M earned the SWAC's automatic berth into the 2021 NCAA Division I Women's Soccer Tournament.

Seeding 

Eight of the ten teams that compete in women's soccer qualified for the 2021 Tournament.  Seeding was based on regular season conference play.  A tiebreaker was required to determine the number one and number two seeds in the tournament as Prairie View A&M and Alabama A&M both finished with identical 8–1–0 conference records.  Prairie View A&M earned the first seed by virtue of their victory over Alabama A&M on October 1.

Bracket 

Source:

Schedule

Quarterfinals

Semifinals

Final

Statistics

Goalscorers

All-Tournament team

Source:

MVP in bold

References 

Southwestern Athletic Conference Women's Soccer Tournament
2021 Southwestern Athletic Conference women's soccer season